Florian Mühlstein (born 12 November 1990) is an Austrian professional ice hockey defenseman currently an unrestricted free agent. He most recently played for EC VSV of the Austrian Hockey League (EBEL). He has previously played in the EBEL for EC KAC and EC Red Bull Salzburg.

After winning the 2014–15 Championship with Salzburg, Mühlstein returned to his hometown in Villach, signing a one-year contract with EC VSV on 4 March 2015.

He participated with the Austrian national team at the 2015 IIHF World Championship.

References

External links

1990 births
Living people
Austrian ice hockey defencemen
Sportspeople from Villach
EC KAC players
EC Red Bull Salzburg players
EC VSV players